|}

The Champion Standard Open NH Flat Race is a Grade 2 National Hunt flat race in Great Britain which is open to horses aged from four to six years. It is run at Aintree over a distance of about 2 miles and 1 furlong (2 miles and 209 yards, or 3,410 metres), and it is scheduled to take place each year during the Grand National meeting in early April.

The event was established in 1987, and it was given Grade 2 status in 1995. It was sponsored by John Smith's from 2005 to 2013 and by Weatherbys Racing Bank since 2014. The field sometimes includes horses which ran previously in the Champion Bumper.

Records
Leading jockey (2 wins):
 Sam Twiston-Davies - The New One (2012), Ballybolley (2014) 

Leading trainer (4 wins):
 Nigel Twiston-Davies – King's Road (1998), The Cool Guy (2005), The New One (2012), Ballybolley (2014)

Winners

See also
 Horse racing in Great Britain
 List of British National Hunt races

References

 Racing Post:
 

 aintree.co.uk – 2010 John Smith's Grand National Media Guide.
 pedigreequery.com – John Smith's Champion Standard Open NH Flat Race – Aintree.

National Hunt races in Great Britain
Aintree Racecourse
National Hunt flat races
Recurring sporting events established in 1987
1987 establishments in England